Saskatchewan Highway 7 is a major paved undivided provincial highway in the Canadian province of Saskatchewan, running from the Alberta border to Saskatoon. Highway 7 continues west into Alberta where it becomes Alberta Highway 9.

Highway 7 is an important trade and travel route linking Saskatoon with several of its bedroom communities such as Delisle and Vanscoy, as well as larger centres farther afield such as Rosetown and Kindersley. Its primary use, however, is by travelers heading for Calgary, Alberta and the Canadian west coast.

Despite being one of the most heavily used roads in the province, as of 2020, there is only approximately 36.5 km of the route that is divided highway; 34.5 km from Saskatoon to Delisle, including a recently completed bypass of Vanscoy, and 2 km just east of Rosetown at the Rosetown Airport and Cargill inland terminal. In 2020, the provincial government announced funding to install eight passing lanes east of Kindersley, as well as further plans for an additional six to the west, bringing the total number of passing lanes to 26 along the corridor and helping to improve safety until such a time as twinning the highway is financially feasible and traffic volumes require such. Extensive oil exploration and development has been occurring since 2010, primarily in the Kindersley Region, from Brock to the Alberta Border. Heavy traffic, agriculture, grain transport, and oilfield service, as well as oil and fuel transports, are common on this highway. Agriculture, and oilfield services are the main industries of the area.  The only District hospital on Hwy 7 is located at Kindersley.

Agrium Vanscoy Potash Operations is Canada's third largest producer of potash fertilizer. In the 1930s early homesteaders would maintain Highway 7 as a means to supplement their income. Provincial Highway 7 followed the Canadian Northern Railway grade for direction of travel with the actual road way being on the square on the Dominion survey township lines. Highway 7 was widened in 1944 and rebuilt between 1960 and 1961.

Highway 7 currently terminates at its junction with 22nd Street West (Highway 14) in west Saskatoon, although it is marked to run concurrently to Highway 11 (Idylwyld Drive). In 2005, work began on realigning Highway 7 in order to make way for the Blairmore Suburban Centre development including the Bethlehem High School, Tommy Douglas Collegiate and the Shaw Centre located where Highway 7 linked with 22nd Street prior to 2006.

Route description
The entirety of Highway 7 is a primary weight asphalt concrete (AS)  national highway within the Ministry of Highways and Infrastructure (SHS) West Central Municipal Government Committee planning jurisdiction. Travel on Highway 7 begins in the west at the Alberta - Saskatchewan provincial border through the Missouri Coteau which features mixed prairie vegetation. Entering Alberta, the highway continues west as Alberta Highway 9. Alsask is a village of about 150 people on the border and Highway 44. The Military Dome site radar station is a heritage site and has been acquired by Alsask along with the 1960s airforce base. At Alsask, Highway 7 turns northeast until km 3.9 when again the highway is routed east. Again at km 6.1 the highway turns northeast until km 19.8 just past the intersection with Highway 317. Highway 7 continues for several kilometres east reaching the village of Flaxcombe, which has a population of just over 100. Highway 307 north provides access to the villages of Coleville and Smiley. This area belongs to the West Central Regional Economic Development Authority (REDA). The town of Kindersley is the largest center featuring both oil and agricultural industries along Highway 7 and with a population of about 4,500 is almost at city status of 5,000 residents. As of 2009, the Average Annual Daily Traffic (AADT) ranges from approximately 1,600 to 2,000 vehicles per day (vpd) near the Alberta-Saskatchewan border to over 3,000 vpd near Kindersley, updated statistics, and vehicle types in 2013 show evidence that the 2009 vehicle count is out of date and severely understates actual traffic flow. Due to its being a key route between Calgary, the fast-growing city of Saskatoon, and economic drivers such as regional oil activity, inland grain terminal locations adjacent to Hwy 7, and Saskatchewan's strong economy, this highway's capacity is under pressure.

Continuing east, Highway 7 comes to a short  concurrency between Highway 658 south and Highway 658 north. The village of Netherhill is also located between the Highway 658 junction and Highway 30 junction. Highway 30 south provides access to the village of Brock. The highway takes a few gentle curves north east at km 106.1 through the unincorporated areas of Fiske and McGee to the junction with Highway 4. Rosetown is a town about half the size of Kindersley located at this junction. The Goose Lake Plain landscape area of the Moist Mixed Prairie ecoregion is the main feature between Rosetown and Saskatoon. The bearing of the highway continues northeast until the town of Zealandia whose population is hovering around 100 people. After Zealandia, the highway continues in a north-northeast direction coming to junction with Highway 768 north and the junction with Highway 655 west and with Highway 655 south. The village of Tessier is next along this northeast section of highway, and then Delisle. Delisle, a town, with a population of about 800 residents is located at the intersection of Highway 7, Highway 45 south, and Saskatchewan Highway 673 on the east side of town. The AADT along the route fluctuates between 2,000 and 3,000 vpd until Delisle. The newly aligned intersection Highway 673 is near the beginning of the divided highway leading to Saskatoon. The corner of Highway 672 south and Highway 762 eastintersects the old Highway 7 at the village of Vanscoy. The potash mine was established in 1931 as Cominco Fertilizers Ltd. changing names in 1995 to Agrium Inc., the nation's third largest producer of potash   The AADT on Highway 7 near Vanscoy increases to over 5,600 vpd. Both Highway 762 provides access to Pike Lake Provincial Park. Highway 7 continues northwesterly arriving at a split intersection, initially built with the potential to be upgraded to an interchange at km 249.7 with Highway 60 south. The highway then crosses the Canadian National rail lines on an overpass, and intersects 11th Street followed by an at-grade crossing of the Canadian Pacific line. This twinned section of the highway handles between 7,000 and 12,000 vpd on average throughout the year. The 11th Street West intersection provides access from the south end of the City of Saskatoon to Highway 7. Highway 7 now ends at Highway 14 at the west end of Saskatoon: at a split intersection that includes the southern terminus for SK 684 (Neault Road); an interchange is planned for this location in the future. This is the new Blairmore Suburban Development Area (SDA) hosting seven new neighbourhoods and anchoring future growth on Saskatoon's west end.

History 

The Old Bone Trail was the name of the red river cart trail between Saskatoon and Rosetown.   The Saskatchewan Highway Act was established in 1922, in compliance with the 1919 Canadian highway act.  At the initial stages of the Saskatchewan Highway Act,  of provincial  highways were gravel and the rest were earth roads.  The road allowances were laid out as a part of the Dominion Land survey system for homesteading.  Travel along the Provincial Highway 7 before the 1940s would have been traveling on the square following the township road allowances, barbed wire fencing and the Canadian Northern rail line.  As the surveyed township roads were the easiest to travel, the  first highway was designed on 90-degree, right-angle corners as the distance traversed the prairie along range roads and township roads.

Mr. Ralph Glen Chapman an early 20th century settler in Pleasant Valley maintained  of Highway 7.  Mr. Block of the German Mennonite settlement at Fiske maintained a stretch of Highway 7 as a means of supplementing his income in the 1930s.  In 1939, Andy Anderson in the same fashion, kept a  stretch of Highway 7 clear.

In 1944 the widening of Highway 7 was undertaken. The Elma rural municipality (R.M.) requested that an automatic warning system should be established at the level crossing of the Canadian National Railway and Highway 7.  At this same time, the rural municipality requested that the hills be gravelled which are situated on either side of Flaxcombe. The third concern in 1948 was to construct an all-weather highway between Kindersley and Alsask, and this too was requested of the Department of Highways (DOH).  In 1950, the rates of pay for roadwork were 60 cents an hour for a single labourer, 80 cents an hour for man and two horses, a labourer with four horses would earn C$1.00 per hour and for man with six horses $1.20 per hour  In the 1950s the R.M. provided grants to the local snow plough club to keep the highway clear after storms.  The 1951 oil strike at Coleville resulted in a Husky service station and bulk plant opening at Flaxcombe on Highway 7 in 1955.  It was located on the railroad to facilitate loading crude oil into rail cars.  Highway 7 was rebuilt between 1960 and 1961. 
Highway 7 currently terminates at its junction with 22nd Street West (Highway 14) in west Saskatoon. In 2005, work began on realigning Highway 7 in order to make way for the Blairmore Suburban Centre development including the Bethlehem High School, Tommy Douglas Collegiate and the Shaw Centre located where Highway 7 linked with 22nd Street prior to 2006.  Starting in 2006, Highway 7 was linked with Betts Avenue, a new city street, which in turn intersected 22nd Street at a traffic signal. The city and province built an intersection farther west (but still with the city limits) at the junction of Highway 14 and Highway 684 (Dalmeny Road), at which point the new Highway 7 alignment links with this intersection. Long-term plans call for an interchange to be constructed here, and a link to be created from Highway 684 to the Yellowhead Highway in Saskatoon's north side, though it has not yet been announced whether the Highway 7 designation will be applied north of Highway 14.

Major intersections
From west to east:

References

007
Streets in Saskatoon